The 1925 Belgian Grand Prix was a Grand Prix motor race held at Spa-Francorchamps on the 28th of June 1925. This was the first ever grand prix held at Spa, and the first ever Belgian Grand Prix.

Entries

Classification

Race

Starting Grid Positions

Notes
 Segrave, de Vizcaya, Masetti, Constantini and Conelli did not turn up because their cars were not ready.

References

Belgian Grand Prix
Belgian Grand Prix
Grand Prix 
European Grand Prix